Kamboul is a district (khan) located in western Phnom Penh, Cambodia. It was formerly a part of Kandal Province before being integrated into Phnom Penh. This khan was created on January 8, 2019, according to sub-decree 04 អនក្រ.បក by taken 6 sangkats from Khan Pou Senchey, and 1 sangkat (Sangkat Prateah Lang) from Khan Dangkao. It has a population of 75,529.

Administration 
As of 2019, Khan Kamboul has 7 sangkats and 93 phums (villages).

Landmarks

References 

Kamboul